Faith Fay is an American actress.

Career
Fay appeared in the film Soul Surfer (2011), the true story of pro surfer Bethany Hamilton. She was a recurring cast member on ABC's Lost (2004). She appeared on the television series Beyond the Break (2006) as the high school character Carmen. She also appeared as CIA agent McNeil in Tides of War (2005), as FBI agent Alice Wells in the indie film Killer TV (2006), as Becca in the indie film Every Now & Then (2007), as Romaji in Tengoku de kimi ni aetara (2007) based on the tragic life story of PWA windsurfing world champion Natsuki Iijima, as Shinko in 50 First Kisses (2017), and as Moana Server in Hiro to Kiiro: Hawai to Watashi no Pankeiki Monogatari (2018), and as a U.S. Marine Corps Captain in the action film Game On (2019).

As a filmmaker has worked on Beyond Sight (2014), and Surfers and Cowboys (2016). Her television work includes the series Retratos Do Mar (2013), Homem Peixe (2014), Mulheres Do Mar (2016), Filhos Do Havai (2017), Salva Vidas (2018), and Surfing Rockers (2019).

Fay wrote, illustrated, and designed the children's book Rattie The Hawaiian Rat Finds A New Home. She is also a screenplay writer, her screenplay Game On, that she also directing was in pre-production in 2019.

References

External links

American actresses
Living people
21st-century American women
Year of birth missing (living people)